Cosmopterix cuprea is a moth in the family Cosmopterigidae. It was described by Oswald Bertram Lower in 1916. It is found in Australia, where it has been recorded from northern Queensland.

References

Moths described in 1916
cuprea